Colchicum lusitanum is a species of flowering plant in the family Colchicaceae, native to southwest Europe and northwestern Africa.

Distribution
C. lusitanum is native to the Iberian Peninsula, Balearic Islands, Morocco, Tunisia, Algeria, Sardinia, and northern and central Italy.

References

lusitanum
Flora of Portugal
Flora of Spain
Flora of Italy
Flora of Morocco
Flora of Tunisia